David Healy (May 15, 1929 – October 25, 1995) was an American actor and singer who appeared in British and American television shows.  

Healy was born in New York City. His television credits include voices for the Supermarionation series Captain Scarlet and the Mysterons, Joe 90 and The Secret Service, as well as parts in UFO, The Troubleshooters, Randall and Hopkirk (Deceased), Strange Report, Dickens of London, Space Precinct, and Dallas. He also starred as Dr. Watson opposite Ian Richardson's Sherlock Holmes in the 1983 TV film of The Sign of Four.

His big screen credits include The Double Man (1967), Only When I Larf (1968), Assignment K (1968), Isadora (1968), Patton (1970), Lust for a Vampire (1971), Madame Sin (1972), Embassy (1972), Endless Night (1972), Twilight's Last Gleaming (1977), Winterspelt (1979), Supergirl (1984), and Haunted Honeymoon (1986). He also gave uncredited performances in the James Bond films You Only Live Twice (1967) and Diamonds Are Forever (1971).

In 1983, Healy received the Laurence Olivier Award for Best Supporting Actor for his role in Guys and Dolls during the 1982 theatre season. His performance of "Nicely Nicely Johnson" was praised as "show-stopping" as he sang "Sit Down You're Rockin' the Boat". He performed a mid-show encore each night. In late 1980s he played the character of Buddy Plummer in the original London run of the Stephen Sondheim musical Follies at the Shaftesbury Theatre.

Healy died following a heart operation on October 25, 1995 in London, England.

Personal life
David married Peggy Walsh and had two sons, William and Tim. He was a devoted amateur polo player and his wife was the manager of Ham Polo Club in London. Both of his sons remain polo players and the David Healy Trophy is still played for in his memory.

Filmography
Espionage (TV series) ('Do You Remember Leo Winters', episode) (1964) - American Sailor
Be My Guest (1965) - Milton Bass
The Double Man (1967) - Halstead
You Only Live Twice (1967) - Houston Radar Operator (uncredited)
Assignment K (1968) - David
Inspector Clouseau (1968) - Villain in TV Western (uncredited)
Only When I Larf (1968) - Jones
Isadora (1968) - Chicago Theatre Manager
Patton (1970) - Clergyman
Lust for a Vampire (1971) - Raymond Pelley
Diamonds Are Forever (1971) - Vandenburg Launch Director (uncredited)
Madame Sin (1972) - Braden
Embassy (1972) - Phelan
Endless Night (1972) - Jason
Ooh... You Are Awful (1972) - Tourist 
A Touch of Class (1973) - American (uncredited)
Phase IV (1974) - Radio Announcer (voice, uncredited)
Stardust (1974)
Twilight's Last Gleaming (1977) - Maj. Winters
La Ballade des Dalton (1978) - Joe Dalton (English version, voice)
Winterspelt (1979) - Pfc Foster
The Ninth Configuration (1980) - 1st General
Sherlock Holmes: the Sign of Four (1983) - Dr. Watson
Supergirl (1984) - Mr. Danvers
Labyrinth (1986) - Right Door Knocker (voice)
Haunted Honeymoon (1986) - P.R. Man
Turnaround (1987) - Sheriff Huddleston
Puerto Rican Mambo (Not a Musical) (1992) - businessman
All Men Are Mortal (1995) - movie producer (final film role)

References

External links

Obituary in The New York Times

1929 births
1995 deaths
20th-century American male actors
American emigrants to England
American expatriate male actors in the United Kingdom
American male film actors
American male stage actors
American male television actors
American male voice actors
Laurence Olivier Award winners
Male actors from New York City